Chandragupta Maurya (350-295 BCE) was the first emperor of the Mauryan Empire in Ancient India who expanded a geographically extensive kingdom based in Magadha and founded the Maurya dynasty. He reigned from 320 BCE to 298 BCE.  The Maurya kingdom expanded to become an empire that reached its peak under the reign of his grandson, Ashoka, from 268 BCE to 231 BCE. The nature of the political formation that existed in Chandragupta's time is not certain. The Mauryan empire was a loose-knit empire.   

Chandragupta Maurya was an important figure in the history of India, laying the foundations of the first state to unite most of India. Chandragupta, under the tutelage of Chanakya, created a new empire based on the principles of statecraft, built a large army, and continued expanding the boundaries of his empire until ultimately renouncing it for an ascetic life in his final years.

Prior to his consolidation of power, Alexander the Great had invaded the North-West Indian subcontinent before abandoning his campaign in 324 BCE due to a mutiny caused by the prospect of facing another large empire, presumably the Nanda Empire. Chandragupta defeated and conquered both the Nanda Empire and the Greek satraps that were appointed or formed from Alexander's Empire in South Asia. He set out to conquer the Nanda Empire centered in Pataliputra, Magadha. Afterwards, Chandragupta expanded and secured his western border, where he was confronted by Seleucus I Nicator in the Seleucid–Mauryan war. After two years of war, Chandragupta was considered to have gained the upper hand in the conflict and annexed satrapies up to the Hindu Kush. Instead of prolonging the war, both parties settled on a marriage treaty between Chandragupta and Seleucus I Nicator's daughter Helena.

Chandragupta's empire extended throughout most of the Indian subcontinent, spanning from modern day Bengal to Afghanistan across North India as well as making inroads into Central and South India. Contemporary Greek evidence states that Chandragupta did not give up performing the rites of sacrificing animals associated with Vedic Brahminism, an ancient form of Hinduism; he delighted in hunting and otherwise leading a life remote from the Jain practice of Ahimsa or nonviolence towards living beings.  Chandragupta's reign, and the Maurya Empire, set an era of economic prosperity, reforms, infrastructure expansions, and tolerance. Many religions thrived within his realms and his descendants' empire. Buddhism, Jainism and Ājīvika gained prominence alongside Vedic and Brahmanistic traditions, and minority religions such as Zoroastrianism and the Greek pantheon were respected. A memorial for Chandragupta Maurya exists on the Chandragiri hill along with a seventh-century hagiographic inscription.

Historical sources

Chandragupta's life and accomplishments are described in ancient and historical Greek, Hindu, Buddhist, and Jain texts, though they significantly vary in detail. The historical sources which describe the life of Chandragupta Maurya vary considerably in detail. Chandragupta was born about 340 BC and died at about 295 BC. His main biographical sources in chronological order are:

 Greek and Roman sources, which are the oldest surviving records that mention Chandragupta or circumstances related to him; these include works written by Nearchus, Onesicritus, Aristobulus of Cassandreia, Strabo, Megasthenes, Diodorus, Arrian, Pliny the Elder, Plutarch and Justin.
 Hindu texts such as the Puranas and Arthashastra; later composed Hindu sources include legends in Vishakhadatta's Mudrarakshasa, Somadeva's Kathasaritsagara and Kshemendra's Brihatkathamanjari.
 Buddhist sources are those dated in fourth-century or after, including the Sri Lankan Pali texts Dipavamsa (Rajavamsa section), Mahavamsa, Mahavamsa tika and Mahabodhivamsa.
 7th to 10th century Jain inscriptions at Shravanabelgola; these are disputed by scholars as well as the Svetambara Jain tradition. The second Digambara text interpreted to be mentioning the Maurya emperor is dated to about the 10th-century such as in the Brhatkathakosa of Harisena (Jain monk), while the complete Jain legend about Chandragupta is found in the 12th-century Parisishtaparvan by Hemachandra.

The Greek and Roman texts do not mention Chandragupta directly, except for a second-century text written by the Roman historian Justin. They predominantly mention the last Nanda Empire, which usurped the king before him. Justin states Chandragupta was of humble origin and includes stories of miraculous legends associated with him, such as a wild elephant appearing and submitting itself as a ride to him before a war. Justin's text notes Chandragupta and Chanakya defeated and removed Nanda from his rule.  Megasthenes' account, as it has survived in Greek texts that quote him, states that Alexander the Great and Chandragupta met, which if true would mean his rule started earlier than 321 BCE. He is described as a great king, but not as great in power and influence as Porus in northwestern India or Agrammes (Dhana Nanda) in eastern India. As Alexander didn't cross the Beas river, so his territory probably lied in Punjab region.

The pre-4th century Hindu Puranic texts mostly mirror the Greek sources. These texts do not discuss the details of Chandragupta's ancestry, but rather cover the ancestry of the last Nanda king. The Nanda king is described to be cruel, against dharma and shastras, and born out of an illicit relationship followed by a coup. The Chanakya's Arthasastra refers to the Nanda rule as against the spiritual, cultural, and military interests of the country, a period where intrigue and vice multiplied. Chanakya states that Chandragupta returned dharma, nurtured diversity of views, and ruled virtuously that kindled love among the subjects for his rule. 

One medieval commentator states Chandragupta to be the son of one of the Nanda's wives with the name Mura. Other sources describe Mura as a concubine of the king. Another Sanskrit dramatic text Mudrarakshasa uses the terms Vrishala and Kula-Hina (meaning - "not descending from a recognized clan or family.") to describe Chandragupta.  The word Vrishala has two meanings: one is the son of a Shudra; the other means the best of kings. A later commentator used the former interpretation to posit that Chandragupta had a Shudra background. However, historian Radha Kumud Mukherjee opposed this theory, and stated that the word should be interpreted as "the best of kings". The same drama also refers to Chandragupta as someone of humble origin, like Justin. According to the 11th-century texts of the Kashmiri Hindu tradition – Kathasaritsagara and Brihat-Katha-Manjari – the Nanda lineage was very short. Chandragupta was a son of Purva-Nanda, the older Nanda based in Ayodhya.  The common theme in the Hindu sources is that Chandragupta came from a humble background and with Chanakya, he emerged as a dharmic king loved by his subjects.

The Buddhist texts such as Mahavamsa describe Chandragupta to be of Kshatriya origin. These sources, written about seven centuries after his dynasty ended, state that both Chandragupta and his grandson Ashoka – a patron of Buddhism  were from a branch of the Shakya noble family, from which Gautama Buddha descended from. These Buddhist sources attempt to link the dynasty of their patron Ashoka directly to the Buddha. The sources claim that the family branched off to escape persecution from a king of the Kosala Kingdom and Chandragupta's ancestors moved into a secluded Himalayan kingdom known for its peacocks. The Buddhist sources explain the epithet maurya comes from these peacocks, or Mora in Pali (Sanskrit: Mayura).  The Buddhist texts are inconsistent; some offer other legends to explain his epithet. For example, they mention a city named "Moriya-nagara" where all buildings were made of bricks colored like the peacock's neck.  The Maha-bodhi-vasa states he hailed from Moriya-nagara, while the Digha-Nikaya states he came from the maurya clan of Pipphalivana. The Buddhist sources also mention that "Brahmin Chanakya" was his counselor and with whose support Chandragupta became the king at Patliputra. . He has also been variously identified with Shashigupta (who has same etymology as of Chandragupta) of Paropamisadae on the account of same life events.

The 12th-century Digambara text Parishishtaparvan by Hemachandra is the main and earliest Jain source of the complete legend of Chandragupta. It was written nearly 1,400 years after Chandragupta's death. Canto 8, verses 170 to 469, describes the legend of Chandragupta and Chanakya's influence on him.  Other Digambara Jain sources state he moved to Karnataka after renouncing his kingdom and performed Sallekhana – the Jain religious ritual of peacefully welcoming death by fasting. The earliest mention of Chandragupta's ritual death is found in Harisena's Brhatkathakosa, a Sanskrit text of stories about Digambara Jains. The Brhatkathakosa describes the legend of Bhadrabahu and mentions Chandragupta in its 131st story. However, the story makes no mention of the Maurya empire, and mentions that his disciple Chandragupta lived in and migrated from Ujjain – a kingdom (northwest Madhya Pradesh) about a thousand kilometers west of the Magadha and Patliputra (central Bihar). This has led to the proposal that Harisena's Chandragupta may be a later era, different person.

Date 

None of the ancient texts mention when Chandragupta was born. Plutarch claims that he was a young man when he met Alexander during the latter's invasion of India (c. 326-325 BCE). Assuming the Plutarch account is true, Raychaudhuri proposed in 1923 that Chandragupta may have been born after 350 BCE. According to other Greco-Roman texts, Chandragupta attacked the Greek-Indian governors after Alexander's death (c. 323 BCE) with Seleucus I Nicator entering into a treaty with Chandragupta years later.  Seleucus Nicator, under this treaty, gave up Arachosia (Kandahar), Gedrosia (Makran), and Paropanisadai (Paropamisadae, Kabul) to Chandragupta, in exchange for 500 war elephants. 

The texts do not include the start or end year of Chandragupta's reign. According to some Hindu and Buddhist texts, Chandragupta ruled for 24 years. The Buddhist sources state Chandragupta Maurya ruled 162 years after the death of the Buddha. However, the Buddha's birth and death vary by source and all these lead to a chronology that is significantly different than the Greek-Roman records. Similarly, Jain sources composed give different gaps between Mahavira's death and his accession. As with the Buddha's death, the date of Mahavira's death itself is also a matter of debate, and the inconsistencies and lack of unanimity among the Jain authors cast doubt on Jain sources. This Digambara Jain chronology, also, is not reconcilable with the chronology implied in other Indian and non-Indian sources.

Historians such as Irfan Habib and Vivekanand Jha assign Chandragupta's reign to c. 322-298 BCE. Upinder Singh dates his rule from 324 or 321 BCE to 297 BCE. Kristi Wiley states he reigned between 320 and 293 BCE.

Early life 

One medieval commentator states Chandragupta to be the son of one of the Nanda's wives with the name Mura. Other sources describe Mura as a concubine of the king. Another Sanskrit dramatic text Mudrarakshasa uses the terms Vrishala and Kula-Hina (meaning - "not descending from a recognized clan or family.") to describe Chandragupta.  The word Vrishala has two meanings: one is the son of a Shudra; the other means the best of kings. A later commentator used the former interpretation to posit that Chandragupta had a Shudra background. However, historian Radha Kumud Mukherjee opposed this theory, and stated that the word should be interpreted as "the best of kings". The same drama also refers to Chandragupta as someone of humble origin, like Justin. According to the 11th-century texts of the Kashmiri Hindu tradition – Kathasaritsagara and Brihat-Katha-Manjari – the Nanda lineage was very short. Chandragupta was a son of Purva-Nanda, the older Nanda based in Ayodhya.  The common theme in the Hindu sources is that Chandragupta came from a humble background and with Chanakya, he emerged as a dharmic king loved by his subjects.

According to the Digambara legend by Hemachandra, Chanakya was a Jain layperson and a Brahmin. When Chanakya was born, Jain monks prophesied that Chanakya will one day grow up to help make someone an emperor and will be the power behind the throne. Chanakya believed in the prophecy and fulfilled it by agreeing to help the daughter of a peacock-breeding community chief deliver a baby boy. In exchange, he asked the mother to give up the boy and let him adopt him at a later date. The Jain Brahmin then went about making money through magic, and returned later to claim young Chandragupta, whom he taught and trained. Together, they recruited soldiers and attacked the Nanda kingdom. Eventually, they won and proclaimed Patliputra as their capital.

Career

Influence of Chanakya (Kautilya or Vishnugupta) 

The Buddhist and Hindu sources present different versions of how Chandragupta met Chanakya. Broadly, they mention young Chandragupta creating a mock game of a royal court that he and his cowherd friends played near Vinjha forest. Chanakya saw him give orders to the others, bought him from the hunter, and adopted Chandragupta. Chanakya taught and admitted him in Taxila to study the Vedas, military arts, law, and other sastras.

After Taxila, Chandragupta and Chanakya moved to Pataliputra, the capital and a historic learning center in the eastern Magadha kingdom of India. They met Nanda there according to Hindu sources, and Dhana Nanda according to Pali-language Buddhist sources. Chandragupta became a commander of the Nanda army, but according to Justin, Chandragupta offended the Nanda king ("Nandrum" or "Nandrus") who ordered his execution. An alternative version states that it was the Nanda king who was publicly insulted by Chanakya. Chandragupta and Chanakya escaped and became rebels who planned to remove the Nanda king from power. The Mudrarakshasa also states that Chanakya swore to destroy the Nanda dynasty after he felt insulted by the king.

The Roman text by Justin mentions a couple of miraculous incidents that involved Sandracottus (Chandragupta) and presents these legends as omens and portents of his fate. In the first incident, when Chandragupta was asleep after having escaped from Nandrum, a big lion came up to him, licked him, and then left. In the second incident, when Chandragupta was readying for war with Alexander's generals, a huge wild elephant approached him and offered itself to be his steed.

Building the empire

According to the Buddhist text Mahavamsa Tika, Chandragupta and Chanakya raised an army by recruiting soldiers from many places after the former completed his education at Taxila. Chanakya made Chandragupta the leader of the army. The Digambara Jain text Parishishtaparvan states that this army was raised by Chanakya with coins he minted and an alliance formed with Parvataka. According to Justin, Chandragupta organized an army. Early translators interpreted Justin's original expression as "body of robbers", but states Raychaudhuri, the original expression used by Justin may mean mercenary soldier, hunter, or robber.

The Buddhist Mahavamsa Tika and Jain Parishishtaparvan records Chandragupta's army unsuccessfully attacking the Nanda capital.  Chandragupta and Chanakya then began a campaign at the frontier of the Nanda empire, gradually conquering various territories on their way to the Nanda capital. He then refined his strategy by establishing garrisons in the conquered territories, and finally besieged the Nanda capital Pataliputra. There Dhana Nanda accepted defeat, and was killed by Buddhist accounts, or deposed and exiled by Hindu accounts.

Conquest of the Nanda empire
Greco-Roman writer Plutarch stated, in his Life of Alexander, that the Nanda king was so unpopular that had Alexander tried, he could have easily conquered India. After Alexander ended his campaign and left, Chandragupta's army conquered the Nanda capital Pataliputra around 322 BCE with Chanakya's counsel.

Historically reliable details of Chandragupta's campaign into Pataliputra are unavailable and legends written centuries later are inconsistent. Buddhist texts such as Milindapanha claim Magadha was ruled by the Nanda dynasty, which, with Chanakya's counsel, Chandragupta conquered to restore dhamma. The army of Chandragupta and Chanakya first conquered the Nanda outer territories before invading Pataliputra. In contrast to the easy victory in Buddhist sources, the Hindu and Jain texts state that the campaign was bitterly fought because the Nanda dynasty had a powerful and well-trained army.

The conquest was fictionalised in Mudrarakshasa, in which Chandragupta is said to have first acquired Punjab and allied with a local king named Parvatka under the Chanakya's advice before advancing on the Nanda Empire. Chandragupta laid siege to Kusumapura (now Patna), the capital of Magadha, by deploying guerrilla warfare methods with the help of mercenaries from conquered areas. Historian P. K. Bhattacharyya states that the empire was built by a gradual conquest of provinces after the initial consolidation of Magadha.

According to the Digambara Jain version by Hemachandra, the success of Chandragupta and his strategist Chanakya was stopped by a Nanda town that refused to surrender. Chanakya disguised himself as a mendicant and found seven mother goddesses (saptamatrika) inside. He concluded these goddesses were protecting the town people. The townspeople sought the disguised mendicant's advice on how to end the blockade of the army surrounding their town. Hemacandra wrote Chanakya swindled them into removing the mother goddesses. The townspeople removed the protective goddesses and an easy victory over the town followed. Thereafter, the alliance of Chandragupta and Parvataka overran the Nanda kingdom and attacked Patliputra with an "immeasurable army". With a depleted treasury, exhausted merit, and insufficient intelligence, the Nanda king lost.

These legends state that the Nanda king was defeated, but allowed to leave Pataliputra alive with a chariot full of items his family needed. The Jain sources attest that his daughter fell in love at first sight with Chandragupta and married him. With the defeat of Nanda, Chandragupta Maurya founded the Maurya Empire in ancient India.

Conquest of north-west regions

The Indian campaign of Alexander the Great ended before Chandragupta came into power. Alexander had left India in 325 BCE and assigned the northwestern Indian subcontinent territories to Greek governors. The nature of early relationship between these governors and Chandragupta is unknown. Justin mentions Chandragupta as a rival of the Alexander's successors in north-western India. He states that after Alexander's death, Chandragupta freed Indian territories from the Greeks and executed some of the governors. According to Boesche, this war with the northwestern territories was in part fought by mercenaries hired by Chandragupta and Chanakya, and these wars may have been the cause of the demise of two of Alexander's governors, Nicanor and Philip. Megasthenes served as a Greek ambassador in his court for four years.

War and marriage alliance with Seleucus

According to Appian, Seleucus I Nicator, one of Alexander's Macedonian generals who in 312 BCE established the Seleucid Kingdom with its capital at Babylon, brought Persia and Bactria under his own authority, putting his eastern front facing the empire of Chandragupta. Seleucus and Chandragupta waged war until they came to an understanding with each other. Seleucus married off his daughter, Berenice, to Chandragupta to forge an alliance.

R. C. Majumdar and D. D. Kosambi note that Seleucus appeared to have fared poorly after ceding large territories west of the Indus to Chandragupta. The Maurya Empire added Arachosia (Kandahar), Gedrosia (Balochistan), and Paropamisadae (Gandhara). According to Strabo, Seleucus Nicator gave these regions to Chandragupta along with a marriage treaty, and in return received five hundred elephants. The details of the engagement treaty are not known. However, since the extensive sources available on Seleucus never mention an Indian princess, it is thought that the marital alliance went the other way, with Chandragupta himself or his son Bindusara marrying a Seleucid princess, in accordance with contemporary Greek practices to form dynastic alliances. An Indian Puranic source, the Pratisarga Parva of the Bhavishya Purana, described the marriage of Chandragupta with a Greek ("Yavana") princess, daughter of Seleucus. The Mahavamsa also states that, seven months after the war ended, Seleucus gave one of his daughters, Berenice (known in Pali as Suvarnnaksi) in marriage to Chandragupta.

Chandragupta sent 500 war elephants to Seleucus, which played a key role in Seleucus' victory at the Battle of Ipsus. In addition to this treaty, Seleucus dispatched Megasthenes as an ambassador to Chandragupta's court, and later Antiochos sent Deimakos to his son Bindusara at the Maurya court at Patna.

Southern conquest

After annexing Seleucus' provinces west of the Indus river, Chandragupta had a vast empire extending across the northern Indian sub-continent from the Bay of Bengal to the Arabian Sea. Chandragupta began expanding his empire southwards beyond the Vindhya Range and into the Deccan Plateau. By the time his conquests were complete, Chandragupta's empire extended over most of the subcontinent.

Two poetic anthologies from the Tamil Sangam literature corpus – Akananuru and Purananuru – allude to the Nanda rule and Maurya empire. For example, poems 69, 281 and 375 mention the army and chariots of the Mauryas, while poems 251 and 265 may be alluding to the Nandas. However, the poems dated between first-century BCE to fifth-century CE do not mention Chandragupta Maurya by name, and some of them could be referring to a different Moriya dynasty in the Deccan region in the fifth century CE. According to Upinder Singh, these poems may be mentioning Mokur and Koshar kingdoms of Vadugars (northerners) in Karnataka and Andhra Pradesh, with one interpretation being that the Maurya empire had an alliance with these at some point of time.

Names and titles 

Greek writer Phylarchus (c. third century BCE), who is quoted by Athenaeus, calls Chandragupta "Sandrokoptos". The later Greco-Roman writers Strabo, Arrian, and Justin (c. second century) call him "Sandrocottus". In Greek and Latin accounts, Chandragupta is known as Sandrakottos and Androcottus.

The king's epithets mentioned in the Sanskrit play Mudrarakshasa include "Chanda-siri" (Chandra-shri), "Piadamsana" (Priya-darshana), and Vrishala. Piadamsana is similar to Piyadasi, an epithet of his grandson Ashoka. The word "Vrishala" is used in Indian epics and law books to refer to non-orthodox people. According to one theory, it may be derived from the Greek royal title Basileus, but there is no concrete evidence of this: the Indian sources apply it to several non-royals, especially wandering teachers and ascetics.

Empire 

There are no records of Chandragupta's military conquests and the reach of his empire. It is based on inferences from Greek and Roman historians and the religious Indian texts written centuries after his death. Based on these, the North-West reach of his empire included parts of present-day Afghanistan that Seleucus I Nicator ceded to him including Kabul, Kandahar, Taxila and Gandhara. These are the areas where his grandson Ashoka left the major Kandahar rock edict and other edicts in the Greek and Aramaic languages.

In the west, Chandragupta's rule over present-day Gujarat is attested to by Ashoka's inscription in Junagadh. On the same rock, about 400 years later, Rudradaman inscribed a longer text sometime about the mid second–century. Rudradaman's inscription states that the Sudarshana lake in the area was commissioned during the rule of Chandragupta through his governor Vaishya Pushyagupta and conduits were added during Ashoka's rule through Tushaspha. The Mauryan control of the region is further corroborated by the inscription on the rock, which suggests that Chandragupta controlled the Malwa region in Central India, located between Gujarat and Pataliputra.

There is uncertainty about the other conquests that Chandragupta may have achieved, especially in the Deccan region of southern India. At the time of his grandson Ashoka's ascension in c. 268 BCE, the empire extended up to present-day Karnataka in the south, so the southern conquests may be attributed to either Chandragupta or his son Bindusara. If the Jain tradition about Chandragupta ending his life as a renunciate in Karnakata is considered correct, it appears that Chandragupta initiated the southern conquest.

Maurya with his counsellor Chanakya together built one of the largest empires ever on the Indian subcontinent. Chandragupta's empire extended from Bengal to central Afghanistan encompassing most of the Indian subcontinent except for parts that are now Tamil Nadu, Kerala and Odisha.

Rule 
After unifying much of India, Chandragupta and Chanakya passed a series of major economic and political reforms. Chandragupta established a strong central administration from Pataliputra (now Patna). Chandragupta applied the statecraft and economic policies described in Chanakya's text Arthashastra. There are varying accounts in the historic, legendary, and hagiographic literature of various Indian religions about Chandragupta's rule, but Allchin and Erdosy' are suspect; they state, "one cannot but be struck by the many close correspondences between the (Hindu) Arthashastra and the two other major sources the (Buddhist) Asokan inscriptions and (Greek) Megasthenes text".

The Maurya rule was a structured administration; Chandragupta had a council of ministers (amatya), with Chanakya was his chief minister. The empire was organised into territories (janapada), centres of regional power were protected with forts (durga), and state operations were funded with treasury (kosa). Strabo, in his Geographica composed about 300 years after Chandragupta's death, describes aspects of his rule in his chapter XV.46–69. He had councillors for matters of justice and assessors to collect taxes on commercial activity and trade goods. He routinely performed Vedic sacrifices, Brahmanical rituals, and hosted major festivals marked by procession of elephants and horses. His officers inspected situations requiring law and order in the cities; the crime rate was low.

According to Megasthenes, Chandragupta's rule was marked by three parallel administrative structures. One managed the affairs of villages, ensuring irrigation, recording land ownership, monitoring tools supply, enforcing hunting, wood products and forest-related laws, and settling disputes. Another administrative structure managed city affairs, including all matters related to trade, merchant activity, visit of foreigners, harbors, roads, temples, markets, and industries. They also collected taxes and ensured standardized weights and measures. The third administrative body overlooked the military, its training, its weapons supply, and the needs of the soldiers.

Chanakya was concerned about Chandragupta's safety and developed elaborate techniques to prevent assassination attempts. Various sources report Chandragupta frequently changed bedrooms to confuse conspirators. He left his palace only for certain tasks: to go on military expeditions, to visit his court for dispensing justice, to offer sacrifices, for celebrations, and for hunting. During celebrations, he was well-guarded, and on hunts, he was surrounded by female guards who were presumed to be less likely to participate in a coup conspiracy. These strategies may have resulted from the historical context of the Nanda king who had come to power by assassinating the previous king.

During Chandragupta's reign and that of his dynasty, many religions thrived in India, with Buddhism, Jainism and Ajivika gaining prominence along with other folk traditions.

Infrastructure projects 

The empire built a strong economy from a solid infrastructure such as irrigation, temples, mines, and roads. Ancient epigraphical evidence suggests Chandragupta, under counsel from Chanakya, started and completed many irrigation reservoirs and networks across the Indian subcontinent to ensure food supplies for the civilian population and the army, a practice continued by his dynastic successors. Regional prosperity in agriculture was one of the required duties of his state officials.

The strongest evidence of infrastructure development is found in the Junagadh rock inscription of Rudradaman in Gujarat, dated to about 150 CE. It states, among other things, that Rudradaman repaired and enlarged the reservoir and irrigation conduit infrastructure built by Chandragupta and enhanced by Asoka. Chandragupta's empire also built mines, manufacturing centres, and networks for trading goods. His rule developed land routes to transport goods across the Indian subcontinent. Chandragupta expanded "roads suitable for carts" as he preferred those over narrow tracks suitable for only pack animals.

According to Kaushik Roy, the Maurya dynasty rulers were "great road builders". The Greek ambassador Megasthenes credited this tradition to Chandragupta after the completion of a thousand-mile-long highway connecting Chandragupta's capital Pataliputra in Bihar to Taxila in the north-west where he studied. The other major strategic road infrastructure credited to this tradition spread from Pataliputra in various directions, connecting it with Nepal, Kapilavastu, Dehradun, Mirzapur, Odisha, Andhra, and Karnataka. Roy stated this network boosted trade and commerce, and helped move armies rapidly and efficiently.

Chandragupta and Chanakya seeded weapon manufacturing centres, and kept them as a state monopoly of the state. The state, however, encouraged competing private parties to operate mines and supply these centres. They considered economic prosperity essential to the pursuit of dharma (virtuous life) and adopted a policy of avoiding war with diplomacy yet continuously preparing the army for war to defend its interests and other ideas in the Arthashastra.

Arts and architecture 
The evidence of arts and architecture during Chandragupta's time is mostly limited to texts such as those by Megasthenes and Kautilya. The edict inscriptions and carvings on monumental pillars are attributed to his grandson Ashoka. The texts imply the existence of cities, public works, and prosperous architecture but the historicity of these is in question.

Archeological discoveries in the modern age, such as those Didarganj Yakshi discovered in 1917 buried beneath the banks of the Ganges suggest exceptional artisanal accomplishment. The site was dated to third century BCE by many scholars but later dates such as the Kushan era (1st-4th century CE) have also been proposed. The competing theories state that the art linked to Chandragupta Maurya's dynasty was learnt from the Greeks and West Asia in the years Alexander the Great waged war; or that these artifacts belong to an older indigenous Indian tradition. Frederick Asher of the University of Minnesota says "we cannot pretend to have definitive answers; and perhaps, as with most art, we must recognize that there is no single answer or explanation".

Succession, renunciation, and death (Sallekhana) 

The circumstances and year of Chandragupta's death are unclear and disputed. According to Digambara Jain accounts, Bhadrabahu forecast a 12-year famine because of all the killing and violence during the conquests by Chandragupta Maurya. He led a group of Jain monks to south India, where Chandragupta Maurya joined him as a monk after abdicating his kingdom to his son Bindusara. Together, states a Digambara legend, Chandragupta and Bhadrabahu moved to Shravanabelagola, in present-day south Karnataka. These Jain accounts appeared in texts such as Brihakathā kośa (931 CE) of Harishena, Bhadrabāhu charita (1450 CE) of Ratnanandi, Munivaṃsa bhyudaya (1680 CE) and Rajavali kathe. Chandragupta lived as an ascetic at Shravanabelagola for several years before fasting to death as per the Jain practice of sallekhana, according to the Digambara legend.

In accordance with the Digambara tradition, the hill on which Chandragupta is stated to have performed asceticism is now known as Chandragiri hill, and Digambaras believe that Chandragupta Maurya erected an ancient temple that now survives as the Chandragupta basadi. According to Roy, Chandragupta's abdication of throne may be dated to c. 298 BCE, and his death between 297 BCE and 293 BCE. His grandson was emperor Ashoka who is famed for his historic pillars and his role in helping spread Buddhism outside of ancient India.

Regarding the inscriptions describing the relation of Bhadrabahu and Chandragupta Maurya, Radha Kumud Mookerji writes,The oldest inscription of about 600 AD associated "the pair (yugma), Bhadrabahu along with Chandragupta Muni." Two inscriptions of about 900 AD on the Kaveri near Seringapatam describe the summit of a hill called Chandragiri as marked by the footprints of Bhadrabahu and Chandragupta munipati. A Shravanabelagola inscription of 1129 mentions Bhadrabahu "Shrutakevali", and Chandragupta who acquired such merit that he was worshipped by the forest deities. Another inscription of 1163 similarly couples and describes them. A third inscription of the year 1432 speaks of Yatindra Bhadrabahu, and his disciple Chandragupta, the fame of whose penance spread into other words.Along with texts, several Digambara Jain inscriptions dating from the 7th–15th century refer to Bhadrabahu and a Prabhacandra. Later Digambara tradition identified the Prabhacandra as Chandragupta, and some modern era scholars have accepted this Digambara tradition while others have not,  Several of the late Digambara inscriptions and texts in Karnataka state the journey started from Ujjain and not Patliputra (as stated in some Digambara texts).

Jeffery D. Long – a scholar of Jain and Hindu studies  says in one Digambara version, it was Samprati Chandragupta who renounced, migrated and performed sallekhana in Shravanabelagola. Long states scholars attribute the disintegration of the Maurya empire to the times and actions of Samprati Chandragupta – the grandson of Ashoka and great-great-grandson of Chandragupta Maurya. The two Chandraguptas have been confused to be the same in some Digambara legends.

Scholar of Jain studies and Sanskrit Paul Dundas says the Svetambara tradition of Jainism disputes the ancient Digambara legends. According to a fifth-century text of the Svetambara Jains, the Digambara sect of Jainism was founded 609 years after Mahavira's death, or in first-century CE. Digambaras wrote their own versions and legends after the fifth-century, with their first expanded Digambara version of sectarian split within Jainism appearing in the tenth-century. The Svetambaras texts describe Bhadrabahu was based near Nepalese foothills of the Himalayas in third-century BCE, who neither moved nor travelled with Chandragupta Maurya to the south; rather, he died near Patliputra, according to the Svetambara Jains.

The 12th-century Svetambara Jain legend by Hemachandra presents a different picture. The Hemachandra version includes stories about Jain monks who could become invisible to steal food from royal storage and the Jain Brahmin Chanakya using violence and cunning tactics to expand Chandragupta's kingdom and increase royal revenues. It states in verses 8.415 to 8.435, that for 15 years as king, Chandragupta was a follower of non-Jain "ascetics with the wrong view of religion" (non-Jain) and "lusted for women". Chanakya, who was a Jain follower, persuaded Chandragupta to convert to Jainism by showing that Jain ascetics avoided women and focused on their religion. The legend mentions Chanakya aiding the premature birth of Bindusara, It states in verse 8.444 that "Chandragupta died in meditation (can possibly be sallekhana.) and went to heaven". According to Hemachandra's legend, Chanakya also performed sallekhana. 

According to V. R. Ramachandra Dikshitar – an Indologist and historian, several of the Digambara legends mention Prabhacandra, who had been misidentified as Chandragupta Maurya particularly after the original publication on Shravanabelagola epigraphy by B. Lewis Rice. The earliest and most important inscriptions mention Prabhacandra, which Rice presumed may have been the "clerical name assumed by Chadragupta Maurya" after he renounced and moved with Bhadrabahu from Patliputra. Dikshitar stated there is no evidence to support this and Prabhacandra was an important Jain monk scholar who migrated centuries after Chandragupta Maurya's death. Other scholars have taken Rice's deduction of Chandragupta Maurya retiring and dying in Shravanabelagola as the working hypothesis, since no alternative historical information or evidence is available about Chandragupta's final years and death.

Legacy
A memorial to Chandragupta Maurya exists on Chandragiri hill in Shravanabelagola, Karnataka. The Indian Postal Service issued a commemorative postage stamp honouring Chandragupta Maurya in 2001.

In popular culture
 Mudrarakshasa is a political drama in Sanskrit by Vishakhadatta composed 600 years after the conquest of Chandragupta – probably between 300 CE and 700 CE.
 D. L. Roy wrote a Bengali drama named Chandragupta based on the life of Chandragupta. The story of the play is loosely borrowed from the Puranas and the Greek history.
 Chanakya's role in the formation of the Maurya Empire is the essence of a historical/spiritual novel The Courtesan and the Sadhu by Dr. Mysore N. Prakash.
Chandragupta is a 1920 Indian silent film about the Mauryan king.
Chandragupta is a 1934 Indian film directed by Abdur Rashid Kardar.
Chandraguptha Chanakya is an Indian Tamil-language historical drama film directed by C. K. Sachi, starring Bhavani K. Sambamurthy as Chandragupta.
Samrat Chandragupta is a 1945 Indian historical film by Jayant Desai.
Samrat Chandragupt is a 1958 Indian historical fiction film by Babubhai Mistry, a remake of the 1945 film. It stars Bharat Bhushan in the titular role of the emperor.
 The story of Chanakya and Chandragupta was made into a film in Telugu in 1977 titled Chanakya Chandragupta.
 The television series Chanakya is an account of the life and times of Chanakya, based on the play "Mudra Rakshasa" (The Signet Ring of "Rakshasa").
 In 2011, a television series called Chandragupta Maurya was telecast on Imagine TV.
 In 2016, the television series Chandra Nandini was a fictionalized romance saga.
 In 2018, a television series called Chandragupta Maurya portrays the life of Chandragupta Maurya.
He is a leader of the Indian civilization in the Rise and Fall expansion of the 4X video game Civilization VI.
Nobunaga the Fool, a Japanese stage play and anime, features a character named Chandragupta based on the emperor.
In the 2001 film Aśoka, directed by Santosh Sivan, Bollywood producer Umesh Mehra played the role of Chandragupta Maurya.

See also

List of Indian monarchs
List of Jain states and dynasties
Mauryan art
Shashigupta

Notes

References

Sources

Further reading

External links

 Maurya and Sunga Art, N R Ray

3rd-century BC Indian monarchs
4th-century BC Indian monarchs
290s BC deaths
Mauryan emperors
Founding monarchs